Minela Gačanica (born 9 March 2000) is a Bosnia and Herzegovina footballer who plays as a midfielder for Ženska Premijer Liga BiH club ZF/NK Emina 2016 and the Bosnia and Herzegovina women's national team.

International goals

References

2000 births
Living people
Women's association football midfielders
Bosnia and Herzegovina women's footballers
Bosnia and Herzegovina women's international footballers